Henri de Verdun was bishop of Liège from 1075 to 1091. He owed his election to the influence of his relative Godfrey IV, Duke of Lower Lorraine, with the Emperor Henry IV.

Henri took part in the Synod of Worms (1076). He was instrumental in refortifying Mirwart castle, which brought enmity from the abbey of Saint-Hubert.

Despite being an imperial supporter in the Investiture Controversy, he built up his diocese by acquisitions (e.g. of Waremme in 1078, Donceel). Internally he operated as guardian of the Peace of God from 1081, and instituted a court system.

Notes

References

H. Vanderlinden, Le tribunal de la paix de Henri de Verdun (1082) et la transformation de la principauté de Liège, in Mélanges Henri Pirenne (1926), 2:589–96.

1091 deaths
Prince-Bishops of Liège
Year of birth unknown